Operation Hurricane Barbarossa was a string of militant attacks in Nigeria aimed at bringing down the oil industry in Rivers State. It was launched on September 14, 2008, by the Movement for the Emancipation of the Niger Delta (MEND) but a week later the group declared a ceasefire, after sustaining heavy losses at the hands of the Nigerian armed forces.

References

2008 in Nigeria
2000s in Rivers State
Conflicts in 2008
September 2008 events in Africa
Military operations involving Nigeria
Events in Rivers State
Niger River Delta
Violence in Rivers State